Theodore "Ted" Roosevelt Patrick, Jr. (born 1930) is an American deprogrammer and author. He is considered to be the "father of deprogramming."

Early life
Ted Patrick was born in a red-light district of Chattanooga, Tennessee, in which he was surrounded by "thieves, prostitutes, murderers [and] pimps". He dropped out of high school in tenth grade to help support his family, worked a variety of jobs and opened a nightclub, then became co-chairman of the Nineteenth Ward in Chattanooga. At the age of twenty-five, he left his wife and infant son in Tennessee, and went with a friend to San Diego, California, where he became an activist for the black community. For his efforts in the Watts Riots in 1965, Patrick was awarded the Freedom Foundation Award, which ultimately led to his job as the Special Assistant for Community Affairs, under then-Governor Ronald Reagan.

Career as a deprogrammer
Despite a lack of formal education and professional training, Patrick was hired by hundreds of parents and family members to deprogram their loved ones. A high school dropout, Patrick based his techniques and practices on his own life experience. Patrick once remarked in a May 1979 televised debate with members of the Hare Krishna group, "How I got into deprogramming was through my own son. All outdoor boy, couldn't nothing keep him in the house. Then one day, he was psychologic... psychological(ly) kidnap(ped) by a cult".

In this interview, Patrick also explained how this search to understand cults led him to speaking with "witches, warlocks, healers" and in fact, he went "all the way to New Orleans" to the same person his mother brought him to for his speech impediment. He also stated that he spent time in a religious group and after a week "didn't know where I were, nor how I got there... I was hook(ed)."

On 12 June 1971, Mrs. Samuel Jackson contacted Patrick to file a complaint concerning her missing son, Billy.

As Billy was 19, the police and Federal Bureau of Investigation would not look for him. Billy was involved with the group known as the Children of God, who had approached Patrick's own son, Michael, a week prior. Patrick contacted other people whose relatives were in the cult, and even pretended to join them, to study how the group operated. This was when he developed his method of deprogramming. He ultimately left his full-time job in order to work on deprogramming full time. Patrick founded the FREECOG organization, later known as the Citizen's Freedom Foundation, in 1971 before merging into the Cult Awareness Network.

Patrick stood trial several times on kidnapping charges related to his activities. After the first trial, which found him not guilty, he stopped executing the actual kidnapping but continued with his deprogramming. He testified before an ad hoc Congressional committee organized in 1979 by Senator Bob Dole. According to The New Republic, Dole intended the hearing to "provide a forum" for Patrick and other anti-cult activists.

In 1980 Patrick was paid 27,000 USD to carry out the deprogramming of Susan Wirth, a 35-year-old teacher living in San Francisco. He was hired by her parents, who objected to her involvement in leftist political activities. The process involved handcuffing her to a bed for two weeks and denying her food. She was later released and after returning to San Francisco spoke out against deprogramming but declined to press legal charges against her parents or Patrick.

Mia Donovan released the documentary Deprogrammed about Patrick in 2015. Donovan's step-brother had previously been deprogrammed by Patrick.

Civil and criminal proceedings involving Patrick
Some criminal proceedings against Patrick have resulted in felony convictions for kidnapping and unlawful imprisonment resulting from his deprogramming efforts.

In February 1973, Daniel Voll of Farmington, Connecticut, summoned Ted Patrick to New York City Criminal Court on assault charges for a botched attempt to deprogram him from the New Testament Ministry Fellowship, part of the burgeoning Jesus Movement. Voll alleged that on 29 January 1973, while walking to his apartment in uptown New York City, he was abducted by his parents and Patrick. On 13 February 1973, Voll pressed assault charges against Patrick, of which he was acquitted.

In May 1974, Patrick held Dena Thomas Jones and Kathy Markis against their wills with some of their acquaintances in Denver because they were believed to be controlled by a "satanic group." District Court Judge Zita Weinshienk sentenced Patrick to a seven-day jail term and a 1,000 USD fine in June 1974 in order to teach him he "can't play God or the law". However, the Evening Independent (St. Petersburg, Florida) reported that he received an eight-month sentence for this incident.

In December 1974, Patrick was acquitted of kidnapping charges in Seattle, Washington. Kathe Crampton, who called herself Dedication Israel after joining the Love Family, was brought to San Diego from Seattle to be deprogrammed by Patrick and her parents in 1973. She broke free and returned to Seattle where she sued Patrick for false imprisonment, but Judge Walter T. McGovern absolved Patrick, comparing his situation to a person rushing into a street to save a child from on-coming traffic.

In January 1975, Wendy Helander alleged that Patrick attempted to deprogram her from the Unification Church for fourteen hours straight after her parents tricked her into coming to a house in northern Connecticut. According to her, the deprogramming session only ended after signing an affidavit stating she was willing to be forcibly removed from the Unification Church if she were to return. A tape was played to Judge James Belson of the Washington D.C. Superior Court on 21 August 1975, where psychiatrist Harold Kaufman recorded a conversation with Helander about her experience with Patrick and her parents in January.

In May 1975, Patrick was convicted of holding Joanne Rogin Bradley – a 19-year-old convert to the International Society for Krishna Consciousness (ISKCON) – against her will in Orange County, California. In May 1976, Patrick failed to appeal the conviction in the Orange County Superior Court. He was sentenced to one year in prison in June 1976.

In June 1976, Long Beach, New Jersey, authorities charged Patrick with false imprisonment of Richard and Alan Mezey who converted to the Divine Light Mission.

On 3 March 1978, Jessica Marks – a member of the Church of Scientology – filed a lawsuit naming thirteen defendants including Patrick in a deprogramming incident in Portland, Oregon, in June 1976. Peter Rudie, a lawyer named as a defendant, claimed that Patrick was not part of the conversation that took place in June 1976 and that he was not in Portland at the time.

In 1978, Leslie Weiss pressed the charges of assault, battery, and false imprisonment against Patrick and Albert Turner, who assisted in the attempted deprogramming of Weiss on Thanksgiving Day 1974. Weiss converted to the Unification Church in June 1974. The United States District Court for the District of Rhode Island Judge Francis J. Boyle found no wrongdoing on behalf of the defendants.

In March 1979, Daniel Eyink was purportedly abducted by his parents from a Cincinnati restaurant where he worked and held in California with Patrick in order to be deprogrammed from an unnamed religious community in Cincinnati, according to a habeas corpus petition filed by Pittsburgh attorney, Joseph Bonistalli. Eyink's parents sought to gain custody of their son through a conservatorship. Eyink spoke to Judge Maurice B. Cohill who believed Eyink was in the community through his own free will and ended the custody battle in May 1979.

In May 1979, Patrick and Marti Schumacher of Vancouver, Washington – the mother of Janet Sleighter Cannefax – were acquitted on second-degree kidnapping charges after trying to convince Cannefax to divorce her husband of approximately seven months, Charles Cannefax. They failed and Cannefax brought charges against them for which Patrick and Schumacher were acquitted.

In July 1980, Patrick and others were charged with conspiracy, kidnapping, and false imprisonment charges. Paula Dain, a 24-year-old Scientologist, testified against Patrick in Los Angeles, California, in early July 1980. Dain claimed she was kidnapped by Patrick and the other defendants in order to deprogram her from the Church of Scientology. A California jury cleared Patrick of charges in August 1980. Dain and the Church of Scientology later sued Patrick for US$30 million.

In August 1980, Patrick was convicted of conspiracy, kidnapping, and false imprisonment. These charges were related to the abduction and attempted deprogramming of Roberta McElfish, a 26-year-old Tucson waitress, who joined the "Wesley Thomas Family". Patrick was convicted and sentenced to one year in prison and fined US$5,000. Patrick failed to appeal the conviction in 1982 in the California Supreme Court. In 1985, he was found guilty of violating probation in relation to his conviction in 1980, and he was sentenced to three years in prison.

In October 1981, Stephanie Riethmiller was abducted by two men walking to her Cincinnati apartment with her roommate and significant other, Patty Thiemann, who was sprayed with mace. The two men made her enter a van where she encountered her father, William Riethmiller. Her parents sought to deprogram her from her lesbian relationship with Thiemann, which they believed was making her more distant from them. Stephanie Riethmiller was driven to Cedar Bluff, Alabama, where she was alleged held against her will and serially raped by James Anthony Roe, a friend of Patrick's son who Patrick referred to Riethmiller's parents. Patrick also referred Naomi Faye Kelley Goss and a man solely identified as "Ray" to Riethmiller's parents. In Cedar Bluff, she was allegedly held in a cabin where Goss "harangued" Riethmiller about the evils of homosexuality. Authorities brought charges of assault, abduction, and sexual battery against Riethmiller's parents, Patrick, Roe, and "Ray," but all defendants either had their charges dropped or were found not guilty in April 1982. Goss was sentenced to 38 days in jail in 1983. Patrick was on probation from his McElfish conviction in 1980 when the incident occurred, and allegedly Riethmiller's parents paid him US$8,000 to organize Goss, Roe, and "Ray" to deprogram Riethmiller.

In late 1983, Patrick was found guilty of violating the civil rights of Richard Cooper, a member of the Divine Light Mission. The jury ordered Patrick to pay US$40,000 in punitive damages and US$10,000 in compensatory damages. Patrick was unable to pay the damages immediately due to the years of legal battles.

In 1990, Patrick attempted to deprogram Elma Miller, an Amish woman who had joined a liberal sect. He was hired by her husband to return her to him and the Amish church. Criminal charges of conspiracy were filed against Miller's husband, brother, and two others, but were later dropped on her request to the prosecuting attorney, who decided not to charge Patrick.

References

Sources
Conway and Siegelman, "Black Lightning" (Chapter 6 of Snapping: America's Epidemic of Sudden Personality Change), 1995, 
Ted Patrick, Let Our Children Go! (Chapter 1 of Ted Patrick's Let Our Children Go),

Publications
 Patrick, Ted. Let Our Children Go!. New York: Ballantine. 1976.
 Conway and Siegelman, Black Lightning (Chapter 6 of Snapping), 1995,

External links 

 Official Twitter account
 1979 televised debate against ISKCON representatives
 Deprogrammed (documentary film)

American kidnappers
Critics of new religious movements
People from Chattanooga, Tennessee
People from San Diego
Writers from California
Writers from Tennessee
1930 births
Living people
Deprogrammers
Anti-cult movement